The 2002 Vermont gubernatorial election took place on November 5, 2002. Incumbent Democratic Governor Howard Dean did not run for re-election to a sixth full term as Governor of Vermont. Republican Jim Douglas defeated Democratic candidate Doug Racine and independent candidate Cornelius Hogan, among others, to succeed him. Since no candidate received a majority in the popular vote, Douglas was elected by the Vermont General Assembly per the state constitution.

Democratic primary

Results

Republican primary

Results

Progressive primary

Results

General election

Predictions

Results
The race was very close, with Douglas prevailing by just under 6,000 votes or 2.56%. In Vermont for statewide/executive races if no candidate receives 50% then the Vermont General Assembly picks the winner. However, Racine declined to contest it further and conceded to Douglas. Ultimately it was Douglas's strong performance in Montpelier and Rutland that carried him to victory. Racine did do well in populous Burlington and greater Chittenden County, but it ultimately did not suffice. Racine called Douglas at 12:38 P.M. EST and conceded defeat. Douglas would go on to be reelected three more times. Racine would run for Governor one last time in 2010, but narrowly lost the Democratic Primary to Peter Shumlin. After the close contest, Shumlin chose Racine to be his Secretary of Human Services. Racine stepped down from that post in 2014.

See also
 2002 United States House of Representatives election in Vermont

References

Vermont
2002
Gubernatorial